Severin Ahlqvist (15 September 1877 – 4 April 1946) was the first world champion in wrestling from Denmark. He won a gold medal in Greco-Roman wrestling at the 1904 World Championships. Domestically he held the Danish middleweight title in 1901–1902 and 1904.

Ahlqvist was born to Swedish parents. He was an electrician by profession.

References

1877 births
1946 deaths
Danish male sport wrestlers
World Wrestling Championships medalists
20th-century Danish people